
H-54 may refer to:
 Sikorsky CH-54 Tarhe US Army heavylift helicopter.
 Sikorsky S-64 Skycrane civilian heavylift helicopter.
 Eriksson Skycrane civilian heavylift helicopter.
 Hell 54 German cipher machine